Giuseppe Luraghi (12 June 1905 – 11 December 1991) was an Italian lyricist and engineer, working for Alfa Romeo where he also was president.

Luraghi studied economics and trade at Bocconi University
He worked 1930–50 for the milanese Pirelli tyre manufacturer (established 1875).  Before the outbreak of the Spanish Civil War in 1936 he also led the Barcelona office of Pirelli. In 1950 he was hired by Enrico Marchesano (1894–1967), president of the Institute for Industrial Reconstruction (IRI), to become the director of a hydroelectric powerplant in Piedmont. In 1951 he became director of Finmeccanica, the technical branch of IRI, a position he held til 1956.

He continued as vice president of Alfa Romeo, while also being the director of the Lanerossi company 1956–60. From 1960 to 1973 he works for the federal Finmeccanica, in particular as the executive director (CEO) of the Alfa Romeo car manufacturer of Milan.

Luraghi was also a poet and a novelist. He started writing in the 1940s. From 1977 to 1983 he was nominated president of Arnoldo Mondadori Editore, a milanese publishing house that had published his literary works in the 1960s.

Publications
Presentimento di poesia (1940)
Gli angeli (1941)
Cipresso di van Gogh (Garotto, Officine Grafiche "Esperia", 1944)
Stagioni (1947)
Due milanesi alle piramidi (1966)
Come saggista vengono pubblicati: Le macchine della libertà (1967), 
Milano, dal quattrino al milione (1968)
Capi si diventa (1974)
Pepp Girella ai fanghi (Mondadori, 1974)
Miracola a Porta Ticinese (Mondadori, 1976)
Oh bej, oh bej (All'Insegna del Pesce d'Oro, 1987)

Literature
Una sfida al capitalismo italiano: Giuseppe Luraghi

References

1905 births
1991 deaths
Italian lyricists
20th-century Italian male writers
Italian book publishers (people)
Alfa Romeo people
Pirelli people
Engineers from Milan
Writers from Milan